Moral objectivism may refer to:
 Robust moral realism, the meta-ethical position that ethical sentences express factual propositions about robust or mind-independent features of the world, and that some such propositions are true.
 Moral universalism, the meta-ethical position that some system of ethics or morality is universally valid, without any further semantic or metaphysical claim.
 The ethical branch of Ayn Rand's philosophy of Objectivism.

See also
Moral absolutism